The Patriarch of All Romania is the title of the head of the Romanian Orthodox Church. The Patriarch is officially styled as Archbishop of Bucharest, Metropolitan of Muntenia and Dobrogea, Locum tenens of the throne of Caesarea Cappadociae and Patriarch of the Romanian Orthodox Church. Patriarch Daniel acceded to this position on 12 September 2007.

Metropolitans of All Romania

Patriarchs of All Romania

See also

List of hierarchs of the Romanian Orthodox Church
Metropolitans of Ungro-Wallachia
Metropolitans of Moldavia

References

Patriarch
 
Primates of the Romanian Orthodox Church
Lists of patriarchs